Curtis Rapley (born 5 December 1990) is a New Zealand rower.

At the 2013 World Rowing Championships held at Tangeum Lake, Chungju in South Korea, he won a silver medal in the lightweight men's four with James Hunter, James Lassche, and Peter Taylor. At the 2014 World Rowing Championships held at Bosbaan, Amsterdam, he won a silver medal in the lightweight men's four with James Hunter, Alistair Bond, and Peter Taylor.

References

1990 births
Living people
New Zealand male rowers
World Rowing Championships medalists for New Zealand